Darwiniothamnus tenuifolius is a species of flowering plant in the family Asteraceae, found only on Isabela Island in the Galapagos Islands of Ecuador.

References

tenuifolius
Flora of Ecuador
Near threatened plants
Taxonomy articles created by Polbot